Bois-Himont is a commune in the Seine-Maritime department in the Normandy region in northern France.

Geography

Population

Places of interest
 The church of St.Laurent, dating from the thirteenth century.
 A fifteenth-century chapel.
 The eighteenth-century chateau, nowadays a hotel and conference centre.

See also
Communes of the Seine-Maritime department

References

External links

The Chateau de Bois-Himont  

Communes of Seine-Maritime